Mangelia mediofasciata is a species of sea snail, a marine gastropod mollusk in the family Mangeliidae.

Description
Originally described as a variety of Bela nebula (Montagu, 1803), it is distinct by its shorter height and its more pronounced and more limited sinus. Its outer lip is more inflected. There is a white band on the periphery of the body whorl.

Distribution
This marine species occurs in the Atlantic Ocean off Senegal.

References

 von Maltzan, Jahrb.. d. d. Malak. Ges., X, p. 132, pl. III, fig. 12 1883

External links

mediofasciata
Gastropods described in 1883